"Long Black Train" is a song written and recorded by American country music singer Josh Turner.  It was released in May 2003 as the second single and title track from his debut album of the same name.  Having spent more than 30 weeks on the Billboard country charts, "Long Black Train" reached a peak of #13 in early 2004. On April 23, 2018, it was certified as Platinum by the RIAA.

Content
"Long Black Train" is a mid-tempo song featuring acoustic guitar, fills from pedabro and fiddle, and a percussive rhythm reminiscent of a steam locomotive in motion. Using a funeral train as a metaphor, the lyrics tell of resisting temptation from the Devil.
 
Turner told The Boot that the song was inspired by a vision that he had of a long, black train running down a track in the middle of nowhere. Turner said, "I could see people standing out to the sides of this track watching this train go by. As I was walking, experiencing this vision, I kept asking myself, 'What does this vision mean and what is this train?' It dawned on me that this train was a physical metaphor for temptation. These people are caught up in the decision of whether or not to go on this train".

The song is composed in the key of B-flat major.

Critical reception
Steve Leggett of Allmusic said of the song, "sung in Turner's deep voice, it rolls across country radio like nothing else on the scene, the ominous breath of hellfire in the lyrics conjuring up the ghost of Johnny Cash." Hank Kalet of PopMatters also described the song favorably: "It is a proudly religious song, almost fiery, defiant."

Music video
The music video for this song was shot at the Tennessee Valley Railroad Museum in a few different locations along a railroad track. The various shots of Turner include him walking through a tunnel, standing on the tracks singing, and from above while he is playing guitar. The video features various characters, all of whom are participating in various sinful activities (including binge drinking, gambling, drug abuse and prostitution), and are shown on the train tracks as well.  Some of the characters disappear when the train passes over them, indicating they gave in to sin, while the others remain on the tracks, indicating they were able to resist or repent.

The video also featured ex-Army Class 2-8-0 Consolidation #610 as the locomotive pulling the train.

Personnel
 Eric Darken - percussion
 Shannon Forrest - drums
 Kevin "Swine" Grantt - upright bass
 Aubrey Haynie - fiddle
 Wes Hightower - backing vocals
 Mike Johnson - Dobro
 Steve Nathan - piano
 Brent Rowan - electric guitar
 Bryan Sutton - acoustic guitar, banjo
 Russell Terrell - backing vocals

Chart performance
"Long Black Train" debuted at number 60 on the U.S. Billboard Hot Country Singles & Tracks for the week of May 31, 2003.

Charts

Weekly charts

Year-end charts

Certifications

References

2003 singles
Josh Turner songs
Music videos directed by Steven Goldmann
Songs about trains
Song recordings produced by Frank Rogers (record producer)
MCA Nashville Records singles
Song recordings produced by Mark Wright (record producer)
Songs written by Josh Turner
2003 songs